The Temple Owls football statistical leaders are individual statistical leaders of the Temple Owls football program in various categories, including passing, rushing, receiving, total offense, defensive stats, and kicking. Within those areas, the lists identify single-game, single-season, and career leaders. The Owls represent Temple University in the NCAA's American Athletic Conference.

Although Temple began competing in intercollegiate football in 1894, the school's official record book only includes records from after Temple became a Division I-A (now FBS) program in 1971. Even so, these lists tend to be dominated by more recent players for several reasons:
 Since the 1970s, seasons have increased from 10 games to 11 and then 12 games in length.
 The NCAA didn't allow freshmen to play varsity football until 1972 (with the exception of the World War II years), allowing players to have four-year careers.
 Bowl games only began counting toward single-season and career statistics in 2002. The Owls have played in five bowl games since this decision, giving many recent players an extra game to accumulate statistics.

These lists are updated through the end of the 2017 season.

Passing

Passing yards

Passing touchdowns

Rushing

Rushing yards

Rushing touchdowns

Receiving

Receptions

Receiving yards

Receiving touchdowns

Total offense
Total offense is the sum of passing and rushing statistics. It does not include receiving or returns.

Total offense yards

Total touchdowns

Defense

Interceptions

Tackles

Sacks

Kicking

Field goals

Field goal percentage

References

Temple